HMS Devonshire was the lead ship of her class of six armoured cruiser built for the Royal Navy in the first decade of the 20th century. She was assigned to the 1st Cruiser Squadron of the Channel Fleet upon completion in 1905 and was transferred to the 2nd Cruiser Squadron of the Atlantic Fleet in 1907. She was assigned to the reserve Third Fleet in 1909 and then to the 3rd Cruiser Squadron of the reserve Second Fleet in 1913.

Upon mobilisation in mid-1914 her squadron was assigned to the Grand Fleet; Devonshire did not see combat before she was transferred to the Nore in 1916. At the end of that year she was assigned to the North America and West Indies Station and spent the rest of the war escorting convoys. She was sold for scrap in 1921.

Design and description
Devonshire was designed to displace . The engines were powered by fifteen Niclausse and six cylindrical boilers.

Her main armament consisted of four breech-loading (BL) 7.5-inch Mk I guns mounted in four single-gun turrets, one each fore and aft of the superstructure and one on each side. Her secondary armament of six BL 6-inch Mk VII guns was arranged in casemates amidships. Four of these were mounted on the main deck and were only usable in calm weather. Devonshire also carried 18 quick-firing (QF) 3-pounder Hotchkiss guns and two submerged 18-inch torpedo tubes. Her two 12-pounder 8 cwt guns could be dismounted for service ashore.

At some point in the war, the main deck six-inch guns of the Devonshire-class ships were moved to the upper deck and given gun shields. Their casemates were plated over to improve seakeeping and the four 3-pounder guns displaced by the transfer were landed.

The armour of the gun turrets was also five inches thick whilst that of their barbettes was six inches thick.

Construction and career

Devonshire, named to commemorate the English county, was laid down at Chatham Royal Dockyard on 25 March 1902, when the first keel-plate was laid by the Prince of Wales (later King George V). She was launched on 30 April 1904. She was completed on 24 August 1905 and was initially assigned to the 1st Cruiser Squadron of the Channel Fleet. She was transferred to the 2nd Cruiser Squadron of the Atlantic Fleet in March 1907 and was then assigned to the reserve Third Fleet at Devonport in August 1909. In 1913 the ship was assigned to the 3rd Cruiser Squadron of the Second Fleet together with most of her sister ships.

The squadron was assigned to the Grand Fleet in mid-1914 as the Navy mobilised for war. It spent much of its time with the Grand Fleet reinforcing the patrols near the Shetland and Faeroe Islands and the Norwegian coast where Devonshire captured a German merchantman on 6 August. She was refitted in September and again in February. Despite numerous sorties with the main body of the Grand Fleet, she did not see combat. She patrolled the Norwegian coast in April 1916 and was then assigned to the Nore. Devonshire was assigned to the 7th Cruiser Squadron of the Grand Fleet before she was transferred to the Atlantic to protect Allied shipping in December. She remained there into 1919 and was listed for sale in May 1920. Devonshire was sold for scrap on 9 May 1921 and broken up at Barrow-in-Furness in 1923.

Notes

Footnotes

Bibliography

External links

 HMS Devonshire at US Naval history

 

Devonshire-class cruisers (1903)
Ships built in Chatham
1904 ships
World War I cruisers of the United Kingdom